The Bear Creek Ranch Medicine Wheel is a Native American medicine wheel near Greybull, Wyoming. The Bear Creek Ranch wheel is a circular arrangement of stones arranged around a central circle, with radiating lines of stones from the inner to the outer circles arranged in a spoke-like manner. The medicine wheel was placed on the National Register of Historic Places on May 4, 1987.

References

External links
 Bear Creek Ranch Medicine Wheel at the Wyoming State Historic Preservation Office

National Register of Historic Places in Big Horn County, Wyoming
Medicine wheels
Archaeological sites on the National Register of Historic Places in Wyoming